Karen Gail Rudie (born 1963) is a Canadian control theorist and electrical engineer known for her work on the decentralized control of discrete event dynamic systems. She is a professor of electrical and computer engineering in Queen's University at Kingston.

Education and career
Rudie majored in mathematics and engineering as an undergraduate at Queen's University, specializing in control and communication; she graduated in 1985. She has a Ph.D. from the University of Toronto, completed in 1992; Her dissertation, Decentralized Control of Discrete-Event Systems, was supervised by Walter Murray Wonham.

She returned to Queen's University as a faculty member in 1993, after postdoctoral research at the Institute for Mathematics and its Applications.

Recognition
In 2018, Rudie was named an IEEE Fellow, as a member of the IEEE Control Systems Society, "for contributions to the supervisory control theory of discrete event systems".

References

External links

Living people
Canadian electrical engineers
Canadian women engineers
Control theorists
Queen's University at Kingston alumni
University of Toronto alumni
Academic staff of Queen's University at Kingston
Fellow Members of the IEEE
1963 births